Leptodeira larcorum is a species of snake in the family Colubridae.  The species is native to Peru, Venezuela, Trinidad and Tobago, and Brazil.

References

Leptodeira
Snakes of South America
Reptiles of Peru
Reptiles of Venezuela
Reptiles of Trinidad and Tobago
Reptiles of Brazil
Reptiles described in 1943
Taxa named by Karl Patterson Schmidt